Townsville South was an electoral district of the Legislative Assembly in the Australian state of Queensland from 1960 to 1986.

It covered the southern suburbs of the North Queensland city of Townsville, largely replacing the abolished district of Mundingburra.

Townsville South was abolished in the 1985 redistribution, and its territory mostly transferred to the new district of Townsville East.

Members for Townsville South

Election results

See also
 Electoral districts of Queensland
 Members of the Queensland Legislative Assembly by year
 :Category:Members of the Queensland Legislative Assembly by name

References

Former electoral districts of Queensland